Inés Del Carmen Carrau Martínez is a Puerto Rican politician and attorney who has served as the Secretary of Justice of Puerto Rico from July 7, 2020 to January 2, 2021.

Education 
Carrau Martínez earned a Bachelor of Science degree in natural sciences from the University of Puerto Rico at Mayagüez, Juris Doctor from the Pontifical Catholic University of Puerto Rico School of Law, and Master of Laws from the Pontifical Catholic University of Puerto Rico.

Career 
Carrau Martínez began her career as an associate law professor and dean at the Pontifical Catholic University of Puerto Rico School of Law. She joined the Puerto Rico Department of Justice in 1998 as Inspector General, and was later appointed Assistant Prosecutor I. In 2000, she began working at the Carolina District Attorney's Office. In 2009, she became the interim District Attorney of Guayama. From 2010 to 2013, she served as the District Attorney of the Carolina Public Prosecutor's Office. In 2017, she was transferred to the Aibonito Prosecutor's Office.

In July 2020, Carrau Martínez was appointed Acting Secretary of Justice by Governor Wanda Vázquez Garced. Carrau Martínez has committed to continue the investigations of her predecessors as acting Secretary of Justice.

References 

21st-century Puerto Rican lawyers
21st-century American women lawyers
21st-century American lawyers
Living people
Pontifical Catholic University of Puerto Rico alumni
21st-century Puerto Rican women politicians
21st-century Puerto Rican politicians
Puerto Rican women lawyers
Secretaries of Justice of Puerto Rico
University of Puerto Rico alumni
University of Puerto Rico at Mayagüez people
Year of birth missing (living people)